Tinsley Randolph Mortimer (née Mercer; born August 11, 1975) is an American socialite and television personality. She is known for starring in the reality television series High Society and The Real Housewives of New York City.

Early life 
Mortimer was born Tinsley Randolph Mercer in Richmond, Virginia. Her father was George Riley Mercer Jr., a real-estate investor, and her mother is Dale Tatum Mercer, an interior designer and socialite. She has a younger sister, Dabney Winston Mercer. Her paternal grandfather, George Riley Mercer Sr., founded Mercer Rug Cleansing in 1936. Mortimer is descended from multiple First Families of Virginia. She grew up at Graymont, her family's estate in Richmond.

Mortimer attended St. Catherine's School, a private all-girls Episcopal school in Richmond, and later the Lawrenceville School, a boarding school in Lawrenceville, New Jersey, where she was a member of the Kirby House. Mortimer was a debutante, having been presented to Richmond society at the Bal du Bois at the Country Club of Virginia.

She went to the University of North Carolina at Chapel Hill as a freshman in college, but later transferred to Columbia University. At Columbia, she was a member of St. Anthony Hall. She was also a nationally ranked tennis player and played varsity tennis for Columbia. She graduated from Columbia with a bachelor of arts degree in art history, and later obtained her master's degree in decorative arts from the Cooper Hewitt design museum.

Career 
Early in her career, Mortimer worked as a beauty assistant at Vogue and an event planner for Harrison & Shriftman. Mortimer had a line of handbags and clothing in Japan for Samantha Thavasa, for which she was featured in an advertising campaign. Her handbag line, "Samantha Thavasa by Tinsley Mortimer", debuted in winter 2006 with its American flagship store in New York City. She was also featured prominently in Samantha Thavasa USA's online promotional materials and in the company's Madison Avenue store, which also carries her handbags. She subsequently formed her own clothing line, Riccime by Tinsley Mortimer, which was sold exclusively in Japan. In 2008, Mortimer became involved in branding and design for a condominium development.

Mortimer has served as Christian Dior’s beauty ambassador and helped to create a lip gloss named Tinsley Pink. She has appeared in several magazine editorials, including Vogue, WWD, Harper’s Bazaar and Marie Claire. In May 2012, she appeared on the cover of Vestal magazine, which also featured an editorial styled by Lo'renzo Hill-White and shot by fashion photographer Kevin Sinclair. She has appeared on the magazine covers of Page Six Magazine, Virginia Living, Avenue, CVLUX, Maniac, and New York.

She made a cameo on the season two premiere episode of Gossip Girl, which aired on September 1, 2008 on The CW. In an interview for Vanity Fair, Gossip Girl's costume designers Eric Daman and Meredith Markworth-Pollack considered New York socialites Tinsley Mortimer and Arden Wohl as a muse when dressing actress Blake Lively and when asked if they were influenced by New York socialites, respectively. Daman and Markworth-Pollack said that "if you put Blair and Serena together, you get Tinsley Mortimer. Tinsley’s hair is always set and she always looks perfect, but she takes risks." On March 10, 2010, Mortimer debuted her own reality television show called High Society, starring Mortimer along with other socialites such as Paul Johnson Calderon and Devorah Rose. The show documented the lives of Mortimer and her friends in New York City, but it was critically panned and cancelled after 8 episodes because of low ratings. The failure of the show was credited with causing Mortimer's subsequent "downfall" as a New York socialite.

Mortimer wrote a novel titled Southern Charm, which follows Minty Davenport from South Carolina to New York, where she is the victim of rumors. It was published by Simon & Schuster in April 2013.<ref>Lipton, Lauren. She's Back, Branding Irons in Hand, New York Times', March 13, 2012. Accessed March 17, 2012.</ref> Mortimer also wrote chapter in the book The Park Avenue Diet, which outlines recommendations on improving one's conversation and social skills, written by Manhattan diet doctor Stuart Fischer. She has been a contributor for Town & Country magazine since 2017. In 2017, Mortimer joined the cast of Bravo's reality television series The Real Housewives of New York City for the show's ninth season.

In 2014, she launched Home Collection manufactured by Pop Culture Living, an e-commerce site featuring curated collections of home accessories. She currently has her own line of housewares products sold at Bed Bath & Beyond and Wayfair. The collection includes dinnerware, decorative glasses, barware and ice buckets. In June 2019, Mortimer launched a new collaboration of fake lashes with the beauty brand Winky Lux titled "XXO Tinsley for Winky Lux." She designed the product packaging herself. In September 2019, Mortimer walked the runway for Garo Sparo's fashion show at New York Fashion Week. In October 2019, Mortimer announced that she has partnered up with RuMe to launch a Resort 2020 Collection, which consists of travel, fashion, and beauty accessories.

 Advocacy 
In July 2020, Mortimer appeared in a pro-adoption billboard "Buy Shoes, Not Dogs" for PETA. The billboard was located in Chicago, Illinois and Mortimer also appeared in a video, where she encouraged people to adopt dogs from shelters. Mortimer has adopted her two dogs called Strawberry and Shortcake.

 Personal life 
Mortimer met Robert Livingston "Topper" Mortimer (son of John Jay Mortimer) at Lawrenceville School and eloped when they were both 18. However, their parents forced them to annul the marriage. On May 4, 2002, they remarried in Richmond, Virginia. The Mortimers got divorced in 2010. Her ex-husband married British fashion designer Tabitha Simmons in 2018.

On July 23, 2010, Mortimer was featured with her mother Dale on the Dr. Phil show discussing her divorce and her differences with her mother.

Her father died on March 26, 2015 in Providence, Rhode Island.

On February 11, 2017, Mortimer was introduced to Chicago-based Coupon Cabin CEO Scott Kluth by her Real Housewives of New York City'' castmate Carole Radziwill. The pair then entered an on-and-off long distance relationship between New York and Chicago, and as of October 2018, the couple had separated. Mortimer and Kluth were engaged in November 2019 and ended their engagement in March 2021.

Legal issues 
In April 2016, Mortimer was arrested for trespassing on her former boyfriend Alexander "Nico" Fanjul’s property in Palm Beach, Florida. The charges were later dismissed.

Filmography

References

External links
Tinsley Mortimer official site

1975 births
American fashion designers
American debutantes
American socialites
American television actresses
Lawrenceville School alumni
Living people
Fashion influencers
Mercer family of Virginia
Mortimer family of New York
People from the Upper East Side
The Real Housewives cast members
University of North Carolina at Chapel Hill alumni
American women bloggers
People from Richmond, Virginia
American bloggers
Columbia Lions women's tennis players
American women fashion designers
21st-century American women